The Mercedes-Benz M275 (and similar M285) engine is a twin-turbocharged and intercooled, all-aluminium, 60° V12 automobile piston engine family used in the 2000s to the 2010s. It is loosely based on the M137 naturally aspirated V12 sold between 1998 and 2002, and retains its SOHC, 3 valves per cylinder, twin-spark ignition layout, but differs with the addition of structural reinforcements to the engine block for improved rigidity which in turn yields greater reliability. Several variations of the M275 V12 Bi-turbo engine have powered many top-of-the-range Mercedes-Benz and Maybach models since 2003.

M275 

Applications:
 2003–2013 S 600
 2003–2014 CL 600
 2003–2011 SL 600

M275 AMG 
The M275 AMG is a  version, with boost pressure reaching  at maximum, and uses air-to-liquid intercoolers. It uses an ECI ignition system for the two spark plugs per cylinder, which helps with combustion and to support Ionic current measurement function sequence.

Applications:
 2004–2013 S 65 AMG
 2004–2014 CL 65 AMG
 2004–2011 SL 65 AMG
 2012-2015 G 65 AMG
 2005 Maybach Exelero
 2007 Stola Phalcon
 2005–2012 Maybach 57 and 62 "S" trims
2006 Fisker Tramonto V12

2005 Laraki Fulgura V12

M285/M285 AMG
The M285 and his AMG version of this  engine built in Stuttgart, Germany specifically for Maybach badged products. The cylinders are lined with silicon/aluminium, and uses fracture-split forged steel connecting rods.

Spanish supercar manufacturer Tramontana uses a 5.5-liter, twin-turbocharged M285 AMG engine in its cars.  On the top model Tramontana XTR, it produces 653 kW (888 PS; 881 hp) and 1,100 N·m (809 lb·ft).  In 2015, the public will be presented a deforced model Tramontana S with a capacity of 580 hp.

Applications:
 2003–2012 Maybach 57 and 62
2011 Maybach 57S Coupe Xenatec
2005 Tramontana
2009 Tramontana R
2013 Tramontana XTR
2015 Tramontana S

M158 
The M158 is a  version based on the M275. The engine uses smaller twin scroll type turbos (for reduced turbo-lag), a bespoke Bosch ECU, a modified intercooler configuration, and dry sump lubrication. AMG builds this engine specifically for Pagani Automobili for use in the Huayra supercar. The engine is mated to a new 7-speed electrohydraulic automated manual gearbox designed and built by XTrac.

Applications:
 2012–present Pagani Huayra

M279 (Successor) 

In 2012, Mercedes-Benz delivered all the rights of V12 engine development to AMG for future V12-model vehicles. Starting the 2014 model year, M279 has been extensively redesigned and updated their top-of-the-range V12 engine to better conform to increasing emission standards in Europe and the United States. Despite the basic design being more than 16 years old (M137), the new engine has enough modifications and sporting character that the engineers felt it warranted a new engine designation. According to Mercedes-Benz, the most important features of the new engine are:

- Increased displacement to - New forged pistons and forged crankshaft in high-grade quenched, tempered steel- New Engine Control Unit- New Ignition system- New Camshafts- Hollow-stem sodium outlet valves- Low-temperature cooling-water circulation system with separate expansion reservoir.

With these modifications and the addition of Mercedes-Benz's 7G-Tronic transmission on the V12 models, it is estimated that fuel economy will rise about 21% on the European cycle for the large-bodied Mercedes vehicles.

Applications:
 2014–2020 S 600, S 600 Maybach and Maybach Pullman

M279 AMG 

The M279 AMG is based on the new and comprehensively revised M279 engine series, specially tuned for AMG 65 and Maybach 650 models. The multi-spark ignition with twelve double ignition coils and a new higher performing engine management system not only results in smoother running, but also enables even more effective combustion. The effects of this is a reduction of exhaust emissions, which is also due in large extent to the optimized catalytic converter system. The newly developed AMG sports exhaust system, which has a pipe layout with enhanced flow characteristics and only equipped in the AMG models, is  lighter as a result of a reduction in the wall thickness. For the first time in a Mercedes-Benz passenger vehicle, the V12 is mated to a 4MATIC all-wheel-drive system in the 2021 Maybach S 680.

Applications:
 2014–2019 AMG S 65
 2017-2020 Maybach S 650 (Z222)
 2015–2019 AMG S 65 Coupé/Cabriolet
 2012–2019 AMG SL 65
 2015–2018 AMG G 65
 2017-2018 Maybach S 650 Cabriolet
 2017-2018 Maybach G 650 Landaulet
 2021-present Maybach S 680 (Z223)

See also
 List of Mercedes-Benz engines

References

M275
V12 engines
Gasoline engines by model